The 60th Infantry Division was formed in late 1939, from Gruppe Eberhardt, a collection of SA units that had been engaged in the capture of Danzig during the Invasion of Poland. This division was unusual in that its manpower was largely drawn from the SA and the police.

History   
This division participated in the invasion of France (1940) as part of the 1st Army, and was in July 1940 transferred back to Poland where it was upgraded to 60th Infantry Division (motorized). During this upgrading it was reduced to two regiments (the Inf.Rgt 92 and Inf.Rgt 244) and the other regiment (Inf.Rgt 243) was reassigned.
In January 1941 the division was moved to Romania and in April took part in the invasion of Yugoslavia and Greece.

This division participated in Operation Barbarossa, advancing through Uman and across the Dnieper River as part of the 1st Panzergruppe (commanded by General Von Kleist). It took part in the attack and occupation of Rostov until it was pulled back along with other German troops to the Mius River. In a series of defensive battles during the winter of 1941–42 it managed to hold its position and then in March 1942 took part in the battles of Kharkov. Later in 1942 the division took part in the drive on Stalingrad. During the latter part of 1942 it was involved in the bitter battles for this city, and then in early 1943 was encircled at Stalingrad, and destroyed.

In mid-1943, the division was reformed as a panzergrenadier formation called Panzer-Grenadier-Division Feldherrnhalle, as a part of the Feldherrnhalle organisation. For more information, see also Panzerkorps Feldherrnhalle.

Commanders 
 Generalleutnant Friedrich-Georg Eberhardt (15October 1939 - 15 May 1942) 
 Generalleutnant Otto Kohlermann (15 May - November 1942) 
 Generalmajor Hans-Adolf von Arenstorff (November 1942 - 2 January 1943) : POW

Orders of Battle

60. Infanterie-Division, May 1940 - Battle of France 

 Division Stab
 Infanterie-Regiment 92
 Infanterie-Regiment 243
 Infanterie-Regiment 244
 Artillerie-Regiment 160

60. Infanterie-Division (mot), August 1942 - Fall Blau 
 Division Stab
 Infanterie-Regiment (mot) 92
 Infanterie-Regiment (mot) 120
 Kradschützen-Bataillon 160
 Panzerjäger-Abteilung 160
 Aufklärungs-Abteilung 160
 Artillerie-Regiment 160
 Nachrichten-Abteilung 160
 Pionier-Battalion (mot) 160

See also 
 Panzerkorps Feldherrnhalle
 13.Panzer-Division
 Panzergrenadier, Panzer, Panzer Division
 Division (military), Military unit
 Wehrmacht, List of German divisions in World War II

References 
Note: The Web references may require you to follow links to cover the unit's entire history.
 Pipes, Jason. 60.Infanterie-Division". Retrieved April 2, 2005.
 "60. Infanterie-Division". German language article at www.lexikon-der-wehrmacht.de. Retrieved April 2, 2005.

0*060
German units at the Battle of Stalingrad
Military units and formations established in 1939
1939 establishments in Germany
Military units and formations disestablished in 1943
Military units and formations of Germany in Yugoslavia in World War II